Agga Maha Pandita Davuldena Sri Gnanissara Thero (31 December 1915 in Badulla District3 April 2017)  was a Sri Lankan scholar Buddhist monk and a centenarian. He served as the supreme Mahanayaka of the Sri Lanka Amarapura Nikaya from 2002 until his death on 3 April 2017. Thero has also authored several books and was proficient in Pali, Sanskrit and English Languages. Born on 31 December 1915 at Dawuldena in Badulla District, he entered the order of Buddhist monks under the guidance of Venerable Umele Pagnananda and Ven. Umele Piyarathana Nayake Theros in 1928. He was appointed to the Mahanayaka post of Amarapura Nikaya in 2002 and was 101 years old at the time of his death.

References

External links
 Ven. Dawuldena Gnanissara Mahnayaka Thero felicitated on his 100th Birthday

1915 births
2017 deaths
Sri Lankan Buddhist monks
Sri Lankan Theravada Buddhists
Theravada Buddhist monks
Sri Lankan centenarians
Sinhalese monks
People from Badulla District
20th-century Buddhist monks
21st-century Buddhist monks
Men centenarians
Sri Lankan recipients of Agga Maha Pandita